The 2017–18 BIBL season is the 10th edition of Balkan International Basketball League (BIBL). The competition started on 10 October 2017.

Competition format
Eight teams joined the competition and played a round robin tournament where each team faced the others in home and away games. The top two teams qualified directly for the Final Four, whereas the teams finishing on ranks 3-6 played in additional two-legged playoffs to fill the remaining two places. The league winner will be determined on a Final Four tournament, hosted by Rislki Sportist at Arena Samokov.

Regular season

Quarterfinals

Levski wins the series by 171–142

Bashkimi wins the series by 180–175

Final Four

Semifinals

Third place

Final

References

External links
 Official website

2017-18
2017–18 in European basketball leagues
2017–18 in Kosovan basketball
2017–18 in Republic of Macedonia basketball
2017–18 in Bulgarian basketball
2017–18 in Montenegrin basketball
Basketball in Albania